Aloápam Zapotec is a Zapotec language of Oaxaca, Mexico.

References

Zapotec languages